An immigration judge, formerly known as a special inquiry officer, is an employee of the United States Department of Justice who confers U.S. citizenship or nationality upon lawful permanent residents who are statutorily entitled to such benefits. An immigration judge also decides cases of aliens in various types of removal proceedings. During the proceedings, an immigration judge may grant any type of immigration relief or benefit to a noncitizen, including to his or her family members. 

An immigration judge is appointed by (and works under the direction of) the U.S. Attorney General. In other words, under the Immigration and Nationality Act (INA), immigration judges act as representatives of the Attorney General and can only act according to authority delegated by the Attorney General (such as under the regulations) or by the INA. There are approximately 465 immigration judges located across the United States. An immigration judge can either be a citizen or a national of the United States.

See also 
Executive Office for Immigration Review

References

External links 
Office of the Chief Immigration Judge

United States Department of Justice agencies
Immigration to the United States